The Chocolate River Conservatory of Music is a community oriented teaching facility focused in music. It is located in Dieppe, New Brunswick, Canada and resides in newly constructed (2005) building located in the thriving downtown area of the city. The facility offers programs in music theater, piano, percussion, string instruments, voice, and wind instruments. It is named after the Petitcodiac River, which is also locally known as the Chocolate River. The Chocolate River Music Conservatory closed in June 2008.

External links
Official Website

Educational institutions established in 2005
Buildings and structures in Dieppe, New Brunswick
Education in Westmorland County, New Brunswick
2005 establishments in New Brunswick